The  was a prominent Japanese aircraft manufacturer and aviation engine manufacturer throughout World War II. It continues as the car and aircraft manufacturer Subaru.

History

In 1919, the two founders split and Nakajima bought out Nihon Aircraft's factory with tacit help from the Imperial Japanese Army. The company was renamed Nakajima Aircraft Company in 1919.

The company's manufacturing facilities consisted of the following:
 Tokyo plant
 Musashino plant
 Donryu plant
 Ota plant, near Ōta Station. Visited by Emperor Shōwa on November 16, 1934. Critically damaged by American bombardment on February 10, 1945. Currently a Subaru Corporation plant for kei trucks.
 Koizumi plant, near Nishi-Koizumi station. Critically damaged by American bombardment on April 3, 1945. Currently a Sanyo plant.

After World War II
After Japan's defeat in World War II, the company was forced to close, as the production and research of aircraft was prohibited by the Supreme Commander for the Allied Powers. This had a severe impact on Nakajima as one of the two largest aircraft manufacturers in Japan; the second was Mitsubishi Heavy Industries (MHI). Unlike MHI, Nakajima did not diversify into shipbuilding and general machinery, and so was forced to dissolve into a number of spin-off companies set up by its former managers, engineers, and workers. As a result, leading aeronautical engineers from the company, such as Ryoichi Nakagawa, helped transform Japan's automobile industry.

The company was reborn as Fuji Heavy Industries, maker of Fuji Rabbit scooters and Subaru automobiles, and as Fuji Precision Industries (later renamed Prince Motor Company, which merged with Nissan in August 1966), manufacturer of Prince Skyline and Prince Gloria automobiles. Fuji began aircraft production in the mid-1950s and produced military training aircraft and helicopters for the Japan Self-Defense Forces. In 2017, it rebranded as Subaru Corporation.

Products

Company designations 
DB
DF
K
MS
NC
NJ/NZ
NY
PA
PE
Q
RZ
S
Y3B
YM

Naval aircraft

Fighter
A1N -  - 1927 carrier-borne fighter; licensed copy of the Gloster Gambet
A2N -  - 1930 carrier biplane fighter
A4N -  - 1935 carrier-borne fighter 
A6M2-N -  - 'Rufe' 1941 floatplane version of the Mitsubishi A6M Zero
J1N -  - 'Irving' 1941 Navy land-based night fighter 
J5N -  - 1944 Navy land-based single-seat twin-engine interceptor prototype
Kikka -  - 1945 jet-engined interceptor prototype; Japan's first jet aircraft

Trainer
A3N -  - 1936 two-seat trainer developed from the A2N

Torpedo bomber
B3N - 1933 Navy torpedo bomber prototype, lost to the Yokosuka B3Y
B4N - 1936 Navy torpedo bomber prototype, lost to the Yokosuka B4Y
B5N -  - 'Kate' 1937 Navy torpedo bomber
B6N -  - 'Jill' 1941 Navy torpedo bomber

Scout and reconnaissance aircraft
C2N - land-based reconnaissance aircraft based on the Nakajima Ki-6
C3N -  - 1936 carrier-borne reconnaissance aircraft
C6N -  - 'Myrt' 1943 carrier-borne reconnaissance aircraft
E2N - - 1927 reconnaissance aircraft
E4N - 1930 reconnaissance aircraft
E8N -  - 'Dave' 1935 reconnaissance seaplane
E12N - 1938 reconnaissance seaplane prototype, lost to the Kawanishi E12K

Dive bomber
D3N - 1936 carrier-based dive bomber prototype based on the C3N and B5N, lost to the Aichi D3A

Heavy bomber
G5N -  - 'Liz' 1941 heavy four-engine long-range heavy bomber
G8N -  - 'Rita' 1945 heavy four-engine long-range heavy bomber
G10N -  - 1945 projected six-engine long-range bomber

Transport
L1N - naval version of Ki-34
L2D -  -1939 Navy transport aircraft; licensed copy of Douglas DC-3

Army aircraft

Fighter
 - fighter-trainer, license-built Nieuport 24
 - biplane fighter, license-built Nieuport-Delage NiD 29
 - 1931 parasol monoplane fighter
Ki-8 - 1934 fighter prototype 
Ki-11 - 1934 fighter prototype, lost to the Kawasaki Ki-10
Ki-12 - 1936 fighter prototype, lost to the Mitsubishi Ki-18
Ki-27 -  - late 1936 Army monoplane fighter 
Ki-37 - 1937 fighter (project only)
Ki-43 -  or  - 'Oscar' 1939 Army fighter 
Ki-44 -  or  - 'Tojo' 1940 Army fighter 
Ki-53 - multi-seat heavy fighter (project only)
Ki-58 - escort fighter prototype
Ki-62 - 1941 prototype fighter, competed with Kawasaki Ki-61 design
Ki-63 - version of Ki-62 powered by a radial engine 
Ki-69 - escort fighter version of Mitsubishi Ki-67 (project only)
Ki-75 - heavy fighter (project only)
Ki-84 -  or  - 'Frank' 1943 Army fighter
Ki-87 - 1945 high-altitude fighter-interceptor prototype
Ki-101 - twin-engine night fighter (project only)
Ki-113 - Ki-84 with some steel parts (project only)
Ki-116 - 1945 single-seat fighter prototype
Ki-117 - production designation of the Ki-84N
Ki-118 - short-range fighter modified from the Mitsubishi A7M (project only)
Ki-337 - two-seat fighter (project only)

Bomber
B-6 - license-built Bréguet 14B.2
Ki-13 - attack aircraft (project only)
Ki-19 - 1937 Army twin-engine heavy bomber (prototypes only), lost to the Mitsubishi Ki-21
Ki-31 - two-seat light bomber (project only)
Ki-49 -  or  - 'Helen' 1941 Army medium bomber
Ki-52 - dive bomber (project only)
Ki-68 - proposed bomber version of G5N

Reconnaissance
Ki-4 -  - 1933 reconnaissance biplane

Transport
Ki-6 -  - 1930 transport, training aircraft; licensed copy of the Fokker Super Universal
Ki-16 - cargo transport/ground refueling aircraft (project only)
Ki-34 -  - 'Thora' 1937 Army transport aircraft version of AT-2
Ki-41 - cargo transport (project only)

Trainer
 - trainer, license-built version of the Nieuport 83 trainer

Kamikaze aircraft
Ki-115 -  - 1945 kamikaze aircraft; in IJN service, it was called 
Ki-230 - projected kamikaze aircraft

Civil aircraft 
Nakajima-Douglas DC-2 - license-built Douglas DC-2 
Super Universal - 1930 airliner; license-built Fokker Super Universal
AN-1 - a Ki-11 prototype converted to a liaison/courier aircraft for the 
AT-1 - original design of AT-2
AT-2 - 1936 passenger transport
LB-2 -  - 1936 navy's bomber prototype turned airliner
N-19 - a Ki-19 prototype converted to a mail plane for the 
Nakajima N-36 - 1928 transport prototype
Nakajima P-1 - 1933 mail plane; converted from E4N

Jet prototypes
  - 1945 Navy experimental land-based ground attack/ASW jet, two prototypes built; first Japanese jet aircraft
Ki-201 -  - 1945 Army jet fighter/attack aircraft with strong resemblance to the German Messerschmitt Me 262, project only

Aircraft engines
 ; license-built Bristol Jupiter
 Ha5
 
  - powered both the Mitsubishi A6M Zero, and its own Nakajima Ki-43 Oscar fighters. Known as Type 99 in Army service and NK1 in Navy service
 
 Ha-49
 
 Ha-109
 Ha219 (later known as the Ha-44)

See also
List of aircraft manufacturers

References

Citations

Bibliography

 Francillon, René J. Japanese Aircraft of the Pacific War. London, Putnam & Company, 1970,1979. .

External links

 The Nakajima Aircraft Story
 WW2DB: Nakajima Aircraft of WW2

Defunct aircraft manufacturers of Japan
Defunct aircraft engine manufacturers of Japan
Zaibatsu
Manufacturing companies established in 1918
Manufacturing companies disestablished in 1945
1945 disestablishments in Japan
Subaru
Japanese companies established in 1918